Ron Rifkin (born Saul M. Rifkin; October 31, 1939) is an American actor best known for his roles as Arvin Sloane on the spy drama Alias, Saul Holden on the drama Brothers & Sisters, and District Attorney Ellis Loew in L.A. Confidential.

Personal life
Saul M. Rifkin was born in New York City to Miriam and Herman Rifkin, who was born in Russia. He is the oldest of three children. He was raised as an Orthodox Jew and remains Jewish though he left Orthodoxy at the age of 32. His wife, Iva Rifkin, owns a fashion design business.

Career
In 2001, Rifkin's association with Touchstone Television began when he played intelligence agent Arvin Sloane in Alias, opposite Jennifer Garner. From 2006 to 2011, he played second-in-command businessman Saul Holden on Brothers & Sisters, opposite Sally Field. He also played Bonnie Franklin's second boyfriend Nick on One Day at a Time. He was a series regular during the sixth season. In the season 7 premiere, "Alex Moves In", it is revealed that Nick dies as a result of an accident with a drunk driver.

Rifkin has enjoyed a long and distinguished career in film, on stage, and in television. His association with writer Jon Robin Baitz has been especially fruitful. In 1991, his performance in Baitz's play The Substance of Fire won him the Obie, Drama Desk, Lucille Lortel, and Drama-Logue awards for Best Actor. The next year, he performed in Baitz's Three Hotels, for which he received a second Lucille Lortel and Drama Desk nomination. In 1996, he starred in the film version of Substance; in 2002, he appeared in the Baitz play Ten Unknowns at Boston's Huntington Theatre; in 2004, he starred in his play The Paris Letter at the Kirk Douglas Theatre in Los Angeles, a role he reprised the next year at the Laura Pels Theatre in New York City, and appeared in the ABC drama series Brothers & Sisters, which Baitz created, as a character named Saul, Rifkin's real name.

Rifkin received a 1998 Tony Award for Best Featured Actor in a Musical for the Broadway revival of Cabaret. Additional theatre credits include David Hirson's Wrong Mountain, Arthur Miller's Broken Glass, Ivan Turgenev's A Month in the Country, and Neil Simon's Proposals.

Rifkin's extensive film credits include Silent Running (1972), The Sunshine Boys (1975), The Big Fix (1978), JFK (1991), Husbands and Wives (1992), Manhattan Murder Mystery (1993), Wolf (1994), L.A. Confidential (1997), The Negotiator (1998), Boiler Room (2000), Keeping the Faith (2000), The Majestic (2001), Dragonfly (2002), The Sum of All Fears (2002), and Pulse (2006).

On television, Rifkin has appeared in numerous made-for-TV movies and miniseries, had regular roles on The Rockford Files, One Day at a Time, Husbands, Wives & Lovers, The Trials of Rosie O'Neill, and Alias, and made guest appearances on a number of series, including Barnaby Jones, The Mary Tyler Moore Show, Sex and the City, The Bob Newhart Show, The Good Wife, ER, Law & Order, A Nero Wolfe Mystery, Falcon Crest, Soap, Hill Street Blues, Smash, and The Outer Limits, for which he received a CableACE nomination.

Rifkin is the reader for a number of audiobooks, including Lois Lowry's The Giver, Phyllis Reynolds Naylor's Sang Spell, and Jerry Spinelli's Milkweed.

He currently portrays Defense Attorney Marvin Stan Exely, a recurring character on Law & Order: Special Victims Unit. He also starred in Limitless as Brian Finch's father Dennis Finch and appears in Gotham as Father Creel.

On October 1, 2020, a short film, Daddy, was uploaded on Christian Coppola's YouTube channel in which Rifkin stars alongside Dylan Sprouse. In the film, "after the death of his wife, an 80-year-old man checks into The Plaza Hotel to celebrate their first anniversary apart, hiring a male escort to take her place."

Filmography

Film

Television

References

External links
 
 

1939 births
21st-century American male actors
20th-century American male actors
Male actors from New York City
American male film actors
American people of Russian-Jewish descent
American male stage actors
American male television actors
Audiobook narrators
Drama Desk Award winners
Jewish American male actors
Living people
Tony Award winners
21st-century American Jews